An artillery fuze or fuse is the type of munition fuze used with artillery munitions, typically projectiles fired by guns (field, anti-aircraft, coast and naval), howitzers and mortars. A fuze is a device that initiates an explosive function in a munition, most commonly causing it to detonate or release its contents, when its activation conditions are met. This action typically occurs a preset time after firing (time fuze), or on physical contact with (contact fuze) or detected proximity to the ground, a structure or other target (proximity fuze).  Fuze, a variant of fuse, is the official NATO spelling.

Terminology

Munitions fuzes are also used with rockets, aircraft bombs, guided missiles, grenades and mines, and some direct fire cannon munitions (small calibre and tank guns).

Broadly, fuzes function on impact (percussion fuzes) or at a pre-determined time period after firing (time fuzes).  However, by the 18th century time fuzes were aimed to function in the air and in the 1940s proximity fuzes were introduced to achieve more precisely positioned airburst.  Therefore, the terms ‘percussion’ and ‘airburst’ are generally used here unless ‘time’ fuzes are being explicitly described.

Early history
Solid cannonballs (“shot”) did not need a fuze, but hollow balls (“shells”) filled with something, such as gunpowder to fragment the ball hopefully on the target needed a time fuze.  Early reports of shells include Venetian use at Jadra in 1376 and shells with fuzes at the 1421 siege of St Boniface in Corsica.  In 1596 Sebastian Halle proposed both igniting the bursting charge by percussion and regulating the burning time of fuzes, this was considered visionary and nothing much happened until 1682.  These early time fuzes used a combustible material that burnt for a time before igniting the shell filling (slow match).  The problem was that precise burning times required precise time measurement and recording, which did not appear until 1672.  Before this the proofmaster often tested the burning time of powder by reciting the Apostles' Creed for time measurement.

It was not until around the middle of the following century that it was realised that the windage between ball and barrel allowed the flash from the propelling charge to pass around the shell.  This led, in 1747, to ‘single-fire’ and eliminated the need to light the fuze before loading the shell.  At this time fuzes were made of beech wood, bored out and filled with powder and cut to the required length.  Experience taught that there was a minimum safe length.  In 1779 the British adopted pre-cut fuze lengths giving 4, 4.5 and 5 seconds.

The first account of a percussion fuze appears in 1650, using a flint to create sparks to ignite the powder.  The problem was that the shell had to fall a particular way and with spherical shells this could not be guaranteed.  The term ‘blind’ for an unexploded shell resulted.  The problem was finding a suitably stable ‘percussion powder’.  Progress was not possible until the discovery of mercury fulminate in 1800, leading to priming mixtures for small arms patented by the Rev Alexander Forsyth, and the copper percussion cap in 1818.  The concept of percussion fuzes was adopted by Britain in 1842.  Many designs were jointly examined by the army and navy, but were unsatisfactory, probably because of the safety and arming features.  However, in 1846 the design by Quartermaster Freeburn of the Royal Artillery was adopted by the army.  It was a wooden fuze some 6 inches long and used shear wire to hold blocks between the fuze magazine and a burning match.  The match was ignited by propellant flash and the shear wire broke on impact.  A British naval percussion fuze made of metal did not appear until 1861.

There was little standardisation.  Well into the 19th century, in British service, virtually every calibre had its own time fuze.  For example, seven different fuses were used with spherical cased shot until 1850.  However, in 1829 metal fuzes were adopted by the Royal Navy instead of wooden ones.  At this time fuzes were used with shrapnel, common shell (filled with explosive) and grenades.  All British fuzes were prepared by cutting to length or boring into the bottom from below.  The problem was that this left the powder unsupported and fuze failures were common.  The indefatigable Colonel Boxer suggested a better way : wooden fuze cones with a central powder channel and holes drilled every 2/10th of an inch.  There were white and black painted fuzes for odd and even tenths, clay prevented the powder spilling out.  In 1853 these were combined into a single fuze with dual channels, 2 inches long for howitzers and common shell, 1 inch for shrapnel.

However, while the Boxer time fuze was a great advance various problems had to be dealt with over the following years.  It also used a different fuze hole size to Freeburn's percussion fuze, which became obsolete.  They were replaced in army service in 1861 by those designed by Mr Pettman, these could be used with both spherical and non-spherical shells.

The final Boxer time fuze, for mortars, appeared in 1867 and the army retained wooden fuzes although the navy used metal ones.  There was a similar American wooden fuze.  However, in 1855 Armstrong produced his rifled breech loading (RBL) gun, which was introduced into British service in 1859.  The problem was that there was little or no windage between the shell and the barrel, so the propelling charge could no longer be used to ignite the fuze.  Therefore, a primer was added with a hammer suspended above it, the shock of firing released the hammer which initiated the primer to ignite the powder time train.  Armstrong's A pattern time fuze was introduced to British service in 1860 and the shorter length Borman fuzes in the United States.

The introduction of rifled breech loader guns led to non-spherical projectiles, which landed nose first.  This enabled percussion nose fuzes, but they had to cope with the spinning shell and centrifugal forces.  This led, by about 1860, to percussion fuzes with a direct action firing pin and detonator and a magazine to boost the detonators sufficiently to initiate the shell's main charge.

Armstrong's time fuze designs evolved rapidly.  In 1867 the F pattern was introduced; this was the first ‘time and percussion’ (T & P) fuze.  Its percussion function was not entirely successful and was soon replaced by the E Mk III fuze, made of brass it contained a ring of slow burning composition ignited by a pellet holding a detonator cap that was set back onto a firing pin by the shock of firing.  It was the prototype of the T & P fuzes used in the 20th century, although initially it was used only with naval segment shells, and it took some time for the army to adopt it for shrapnel.

Description
Since the second half of the 19th century, most artillery fuzes are fitted to the nose of the projectile. The base of the fuze is screwed into a recess, and its nose is designed to conform to the shape of the shell's ogive.  The depth of recess can vary with the type of shell and fuze.  Artillery fuzes were sometimes specific to particular types of gun or howitzer due to their characteristics, notable differences in muzzle velocity and hence the sensitivity of safety and arming mechanisms. However, by World War 2, while there were exceptions, most fuzes of one nation could be used with any required artillery shell of that nation, if it could be physically fitted to it, although different army and navy procurement arrangements often prevented this.  The exceptions were mortar bomb fuzes, and this continues.

An early action in NATO standardisation was to agree the dimensions and threads of the fuze recess in artillery projectiles to enable fuze interchangeability between nations.  Modern artillery fuzes can generally be used with any appropriate artillery shell, including naval ones.  However, smoothbore mortars constrain the choice of safety and arming mechanisms because there is no centrifugal force and muzzle velocities are relatively low.  Therefore, shell fuzes cannot be used with mortar bombs, and mortar fuzes are unsuitable for the higher velocities of shells.

The fuze action is initiated by impact, elapsed time after firing or proximity to a target. In most cases the fuze action causes detonation of the main high explosive charge in a shell or a small charge to eject a carrier shell's contents.  These contents may be lethal, such as the now-obsolete shrapnel shell or modern sub-munitions, or non-lethal such as canisters containing a smoke compound or a parachute flare.

Fuzes normally have two explosive components in their explosive train: a very small detonator (or primer) struck by a firing pin, and a booster charge at the base of the fuze (sometimes called the 'magazine'). This booster is powerful enough to detonate the main charge in a high-explosive shell or the ejecting charge in a carrier shell. The two charges are typically connected by a 'flash tube'.

The safety and arming arrangements in artillery fuzes are critical features to prevent the fuze functioning until required, no matter how harsh its transport and handling. These arrangements use the forces created by the gun or howitzer firing – high acceleration (or ‘shock of firing’) and rotation (caused by the rifling in the gun or howitzer barrel) - to release the safety features and arm the fuze.  Some older types of fuze also had safety features such as pins or caps removed by the user before loading the shell into the breach.  Defective fuzes can function while the shell is in the barrel - a 'bore premature', or further along the trajectory.

Different fuze designs have different safety and arming mechanisms that use the two forces in various ways.  The earliest ‘modern’ fuzes used wire sheared by the shock of firing.  Subsequently, centripetal devices were generally preferred for use with low-velocity howitzer shells because the set-back was often insufficient. However, late 19th- and 20th-century designs used more sophisticated combinations of methods that applied the two forces. Examples include:
 Centripetal force moving a bolt outwards, which allows another bolt to move backwards by inertia from acceleration.
 Inertia from acceleration overcoming the pressure of a retaining spring to release a catch that allows an arm, plate, segmented sleeve or other bolt to move outwards by centrifugal force.
 Centripetal force causing a plate holding a detonator to swing into alignment with a firing pin.
 Centripetal force causing a barrier plate(s) or block(s) to overcome a spring(s) and swing out of the channel between the firing pin and detonator or between the detonator and the booster (or both).
 Rotation causing a weighted tape to unwind from around a spindle and free the firing pin hammer.

Modern safety and arming devices are part of an overall fuze design that meets insensitive munitions requirements.  This includes careful selection of the explosives used throughout the explosive train, strong physical barriers between the detonator and booster until the shell is fired and positioning explosive components for maximum protection in the fuze.

Types of artillery fuze

Percussion fuzes

In the 20th century, most fuzes were 'percussion'.  They may be 'direct action' (also called 'point detonating' or ‘super quick’) or 'graze'.  They may also offer a ‘delay’ option.
Percussion fuzes remain widespread particularly for training.  However, in the 19th century combined ‘T & P’ fuzes became common and this combination remain widespread with airburst fuzes in case the airburst function failed or was set too ‘long’.  War stocks in western armies are now predominantly 'multi-function' offering a choice of several ground and airburst functions.

Direct action fuzes
Direct action fuzes function by the fuze nose hitting something reasonably solid, such as the ground, a building or a vehicle, and pushing a firing pin into a detonator.  The early British fuze at left is an example.

Direct action fuze designs are 'super-quick' but may have a delay option.  20th-century designs vary in the relative positions of their key elements.  The extremes being the firing pin and detonator close to the nose with a long flash tube to the booster (typical in US designs), or a long firing pin to a detonator close to the booster and a short flash tube (typical in British designs).

Graze fuzes
Graze fuzes function when the shell is suddenly slowed down, e.g. by hitting the ground or going through a wall. This deceleration causes the firing pin to move forward, or the detonator to move backward, sharply and strike each other.  Graze is the only percussion mechanism that can be used in base fuzes.
An additional definition widely used is that such a fuze is usually an inertially-fired fuze (such as a base fuze mentioned above) that has special features to increase the chance of the fuze functioning if it hits the target at a highly oblique angle that can frequently jam ("blind") such fuzes due to the high sideways forces generated.  For example, the later WWII German Navy armor-piercing projectile base fuzes ("Bodenzunder") had such fuzes of several kinds, such a design with both the weighted firing pin and the explosive detonator pellet both free to move, held apart only by friction or a light spring, after arming in flight by removing a series of rotating shutters locking them in place before firing the projectile.  Thus, on a highly oblique -- "glancing" or "grazing" -- impact, there was a higher chance that at least one of them would be free to move toward the other and be thrown toward the other during the target impact with enough force to explode the detonator and start the shell explosive train in operation.  There are a number of other design variations for this effect.

Delay fuzes
Direct action fuzes can have a delay function, selected at the gun as an alternative to direct action. Delay may use a graze function or some other mechanism. Special 'concrete piercing' fuzes usually have only a delay function and a hardened and strengthened fuze nose.

Base fuzes
Base fuzes are enclosed within the base of the shell and are hence not damaged by the initial impact with the target.  Their delay timing may be adjustable before firing. They use graze action and have not been widely used by field artillery.  Base fuzed shells were used by coast artillery (and warships) against armoured warships into the 1950s.  They have also had some use against tanks, including with High Explosive Squash Head (HESH), also called High Explosive Plastic (HEP) used after World War II by 105mm artillery for self-defence against tanks and by tanks.

Airburst fuzes
Airburst fuzes, using a preset timing device initiated by the gun firing, were the earliest type of fuze.  They were particularly important in the 19th and early 20th centuries when shrapnel fuzes were widely used. They again became important when cluster munitions became a major element in Cold War ammunition stocks, and the moves to multi-function fuzes in the late 20th century mean that in some western countries airburst fuzes are available with every shell used on operations.

Time fuzes were essential for larger calibre anti-aircraft guns, and it soon became clear that igniferous fuzes were insufficiently accurate and this drove the development of mechanical time fuzes between the world wars.  During World War 2 radio proximity fuzes were introduced, initially for use against aircraft where they proved far superior to mechanical time, and at the end of 1944 for field artillery.

Time fuzes

Artillery Time fuzes detonate after a set period of time.  Early time fuzes were igniferous (i.e. combustible) using a powder train.  Clockwork mechanisms appeared at the beginning of the 20th century and electronic time fuzes appeared in the 1980s, soon after digital watches.

Almost all artillery time fuzes are fitted to the nose of the shell.  One exception was the 1950s design US 8-inch nuclear shell (M422) that had a triple-deck mechanical time base fuze.

The time delay of a time fuze is usually calculated as part of the technical fire control calculations, and not done at the gun although armies have differed in their arrangements.  The fuze delay primarily reflects the range to the target and the required height of burst.  High height of burst, typically a few hundred metres, is usually used with star shell (illuminating shell) and other base ejecting shells such as smoke and cluster munitions, and for observing with high-explosive (HE) shells in some circumstances.  Low airburst, typically about 10 metres, was used with HE.  The height of burst with shrapnel depended on the angle of descent, but for optimal use it was a few tens of metres.

Igniferous time fuzes had a powder ring in an inverted ‘U’ metal channel, the fuze was set by rotating the upper part of the fuze.  When the shell was fired the shock of firing set back a detonator onto a firing pin, which ignited the powder ring, when the burn reached the fuze setting it flashed through a hole into the fuze magazine, which then ignited the bursting charge in the shell.  If the shell contained HE then the fuze had a gaine that converted the powder explosion into a detonation powerful enough to detonate the HE.

The problem with igniferous fuzes was that they were not very precise and somewhat erratic, but good enough for flat trajectory shrapnel (ranges were relatively short by later standards) or high bursting carrier shells.  While improvements in powder composition helped, there were several complex factors that prevented a high degree of regularity in the field. Britain in particular encountered great difficulty in achieving consistency early in World War I (1914 and 1915) with its attempts to use its by-then obsolescent gunpowder-train time fuzes for anti-aircraft fire against German bombers and airships which flew at altitudes up to 20,000 feet. It was then discovered that standard gunpowder burned differently at differing altitudes, and the problem was then rectified to some extent by specially designed fuzes with modified gunpowder formulations. Britain finally switched to mechanical (i.e. clockwork) time fuzes just after World War I which solved this problem. Residual stocks of igniferous fuzes lasted for many years after World War 2 with smoke and illuminating shells.

Before World War I Krupp, in Germany, started producing the Baker clockwork fuze.  It contained a spring clock with an extra rapid cylinder escapement giving 30 beats per second.   During World War 1 Germany developed other mechanical time, i.e. clockwork, fuzes.  These were less erratic and more precise than igniferous fuzes, critical characteristics as gun ranges increased.  Between the wars five or six different mechanisms were developed in various nations.  However, three came to predominate, the Thiel pattern in British designs, Junghans pattern in American designs and the Swiss Dixi mechanisms, the first two having originated in World War 1 Germany.  Mechanical time fuzes remain in service with many armies.

Mechanical time fuzes were just about good enough to use with field artillery to achieve the effective HE height of burst of about 10 metres above the ground.  However, 'good enough' usually meant '4 in the air and 2 on the ground'. This fuze length was extremely difficult to predict with adequate accuracy, so the height of burst almost always had to be adjusted by observation.

Proximity fuzes

The benefits of a fuze that functioned when it detected a target in proximity are obvious, particularly for use against aircraft.  The first such fuze seems to have been developed by the British in the 1930s for use with their anti-aircraft ‘unrotated projectiles’ – rockets.  These used a photo-electric fuze.

During 1940-42 a private venture initiative by Pye Ltd, a leading British wireless manufacturer, worked on the development of a radio proximity fuze. Pye's research was transferred to the United States as part of the technology package delivered by the Tizard Mission when the United States entered the war.  These fuzes emitted radio waves and sensed their reflection from the target (aircraft or ground), the strength of the reflected signal indicated the distance to the target, when this was correct the fuze detonated.

For the first 18 months or so proximity fuzes were restricted to anti-aircraft use to ensure that none was retrieved by the enemy and copied.  They were also called ‘variable time’ or VT to obscure their nature.  They were finally released for field artillery use in December 1944 in Europe.  While they were not perfect and bursts could still be erratic due to rain, they were a vast improvement on mechanical time in delivering a very high proportion of bursts at the required 10 metre height.  However, VT fuzes went far deeper into the shell than other fuzes because they had a battery that was activated by the shock of firing.  This meant the fuze recess had to be deeper, so to enable shorter non-VT fuzes the deep recess was filled with removable supplementary HE canisters.

After the war the next generation of proximity fuze included a mechanical timer to switch on the fuze a few seconds before it was due at the target.  These were called controlled variable time’ (CVT) and reduced the incidence of early bursts.  Later models had additional electronic counter  measures.

Distance measuring fuzes
The mechanical distance fuze has had little use, Thompson's pattern was trialled by the British but did not enter service.  The fuzes operated by counting revolutions.  It has the advantage of inherent safety and not requiring any internal driving force but depended on muzzle velocity and rifling pitch.  However, these are allowed for when calculating the fuze setting.  Early 20th-century versions were sometimes called ‘flag fuzes’, so named due to the vane protruding from the nose of the fuze.

Electronic time fuzes
In the late 1970s/early 1980s electronic time fuzes started replacing earlier types.  These were based on the use of oscillating crystals that had been adopted for digital watches.  Like watches, advances in electronics made them much cheaper to produce than mechanical devices.  The introduction of these fuzes coincided with the widespread adoption of cluster munitions in some NATO countries.

Multi function fuzes

A fuze assembly may include more than one fuze function. A typical combination would be a T & P ("Time & Percussion") fuze with the fuze set to detonate on impact or expiration of a preset time, whichever occurred first. Such fuzes were introduced around the middle of the 19th century.  This combination may function as a safety measure or as an expedient to ensure that the shell will be actuated no matter what happens and hence not be wasted.  The United States called mechanical T & P fuzes ‘mechanical time super quick’ (MTSQ).  T & P fuzes were normal with shrapnel and HE shells (including proximity fuzes), but were not always used with high bursting carrier shells.

However, in the early 1980s electronic fuzes with several functions and options started appearing.  Initially they were little more than enhanced versions of proximity fuzes, typically offering a choice of proximity heights or impact options.  A choice of burst heights could also be used to get optimum burst heights in terrain with different reflectivity.  However, they were cheaper than older proximity fuzes and the cost of adding electronic functions was marginal, this meant they were much more widely issued. In some countries all their war stock HE was fitted with them, instead of only 5 – 10% with proximity fuzes.

The most modern multi-option artillery fuzes offer a comprehensive choice of functions.  For example, Junghans DM84U provides delay, super quick, time (up to 199 seconds), two proximity heights of burst and five depths of foliage penetration.

Sensor fuzes
Sensor fuzes can be considered smart proximity fuzes.  Initial developments were the United States ‘Seek and Destroy Armour’ (SADARM) in the 1980s using sub-munitions ejected from 203 mm carrier shell.  Subsequent European developments, BONUS and SMArt 155, are 155 mm calibre due to advances in electronics.  These sensor fuzes typically use millimetric radar to recognise a tank and then aim the sub-munition at it and fire an explosively formed penetrator from above.

Course correcting fuzes
The main fuze developments in the early 21st century are near-precision course-correcting fuzes (CCF), replacing the standard multi-option nose fuze with a package adding GPS-guided trajectory correction. The cost is much lower than true precision-guided artillery munitions, making them suitable for widespread use. An example is the M1156 Precision Guidance Kit which improves the accuracy of 155mm shells fivefold  at max range (50m CEP vs 267m CEP).

Fuze setting
Many fuzes have to be set before being loaded into the breech, although in the case of impact fuzes it may be very simple matter of selecting the delay option if required, 'instantaneous' being the factory set default.  However, airburst fuzes have to have the required fuze length set.  Modern fuzes invariably use a fuze length in seconds (with at least tenths) that reflect the required time of flight.  However, some earlier time fuzes used arbitrary units of time.

The fuze length reflects the range between the gun and its target, before digital computers this range was manually calculated in the command post or fire direction center.  Some armies converted the range to an elevation and fuze length and ordered it to the guns.  Others set the range on the sights and each gun had a fuze indicator that converted the range to a fuze length (with allowance for muzzle velocity and local conditions).  In World War I German fuzes were graduated with ranges in metres.

With digital computers fuze lengths are usually computed in the command post or fire direction center, unless the gun itself does the full ballistic calculations.

Naval and anti-aircraft artillery started using analogue computers before World War 2, these were connected to the guns to automatically aim them.  They also had automatic fuze setters.  This was particularly important for anti-aircraft guns that were aiming ahead of their target and so needed a very regular and predictable rate of fire.

Field artillery used manual time fuze setting, at its simplest this uses a hand ‘key’ or wrench to turn the fuze nose to the required setting.  Manual fuze setters are set at the fuze length and then used to set the fuze, this has the advantage of ensuring that every fuze is correctly and identically set.  Electronic fuzes are designed use electronic setters to transfer data electronically, early ones required an electrical contact between the fuze and the setter.  These have been superseded by induction fuze setters that do not require physical contact with the fuze.  Electronic setters may also check fuze functioning in a ‘Go/No Go’ test.

Fuze Packaging
Fuzes may be delivered fitted to shells or in separate containers, in the latter case the shell itself has a plug that has to be removed before fitting the fuze.  Historically, fuzed HE shells were provided with a standard impact fuze that had to be removed and replaced by a time fuze when airburst was required.

Whether or not shells are delivered fuzed depends on whether or not the shells are in sealed packaging.  Historically smaller calibres, e.g. 105mm and less, usually were while larger calibre shells were without packaging and plugged.  However, in many armies it is now normal for 155mm shells to be delivered in sealed packaging with fuzes fitted.

Image gallery

See also
 Contact fuze
 Fuze (explosives)
 Proximity fuze
 Time bomb
 Precision bombing
 Precision-guided munition
 Guided bomb
 Guidance system
 Terminal guidance
 Proximity sensor
 Magnetic proximity fuze
 Missile

Notes

References
Bethel, HA.  1911. ”Modern artillery in the field”.  London: Macmillan & Co.
Hogg, OFG.  1970. “Artillery: its origin, heyday and decline”.  London: C Hurst and Company.
 Ian V. Hogg & L.F. Thurston, "British Artillery Weapons & Ammunition 1914 - 1918", Ian Allan, 1972
Canada. Army Electronic Library. Field Artillery Volume 6. Ballistics and Ammunition. B-GL-306-006/FP-001 1992-06-01

External links
"THE MAIN TYPES OF WW1 FUSES AND THEIR MECHANISM" diagrams & explanations, especially French fuze types
"SOME OTHER FUSES AND ACCESSORIES" notes on French, Belgian, British & German fuzes of World War I
Safing, Arming, Fuzing, and Firing (SAFF) info from Globalsecurity.org
90th Infantry Division Preservation Group - page on 81mm Mortar Fuzes
Fundamentals of Naval Weapons Systems. Chapter 14 Fuzing Weapons and Systems Engineering Department, United States Naval Academy
Fuzes ordnance.org
Fuzes globalsecurity.org

Fuzes